Sheila Arnold (born January 15, 1929) was an American politician in the state of Wyoming. She served in the Wyoming House of Representatives as a member of the Democratic Party. She worked in the investment business and is an alumna of the University of California, Los Angeles.

References

1929 births
Living people
Politicians from New York City
University of California, Los Angeles alumni
Businesspeople from Wyoming
Women state legislators in Wyoming
Democratic Party members of the Wyoming House of Representatives
20th-century American women politicians
20th-century American politicians
21st-century American women